Hugh Laurence Doherty (8 October 1875 – 21 August 1919) was a British tennis player and the younger brother of tennis player Reginald Doherty. He was a six-time Grand Slam champion and a double Olympic Gold medalist at the 1900 Summer Olympics in singles and doubles (also winning a Bronze in mixed doubles). In 1903 he became the first non-American player to win the U.S. National Championships.

Early life

Doherty was born on 8 October 1875 at Beulah Villa in Wimbledon, London, the youngest son of William Doherty, a printer, and his wife, Catherine Ann Davis. Doherty was the shorter of the two brothers, at 1.78 m, who played championship tennis in their native England and at Wimbledon at the turn of the century.

Like his brother he was educated at Westminster School from 1890 to 1894 followed by Trinity Hall, Cambridge, where he played for and became President of the Cambridge University Lawn Tennis Club. He gained his blues in 1896, 1897, and 1898. In 1892 Doherty won the Renshaw cup, the All-England Championships singles title for boys under 16 which was held in Scarborough.

In addition to lawn tennis he also played real tennis and golf.

Career
The brothers were reportedly urged to play tennis by their father, for health reasons. Known as "Little Do", Doherty won Wimbledon five consecutive times in singles and eight times in doubles with his brother. In 1903, he became the first tennis player to win a Grand Slam tournament outside of his native country by beating defending champion William Larned in three straight sets in the final of the US Championships in Newport. He won the singles title at the British Covered Court Championships, played at the Queen's Club in London, six consecutive times between 1901 and 1906. Additionally he won the singles title at The South of France Championships in Nice seven times in a row (1900–1906).

Doherty won the singles event of the tennis competition at the 1900 Summer Olympics in Paris.  Gold medals were not given at the 1900 Games. In the semifinal he was scheduled to play against his brother but Reggie withdrew, since the brothers refused to play each other before the final. In the final Doherty defeated Harold Mahony in three straight sets. Doherty also won the doubles title at the 1900 Olympic Games with his brother. In the mixed doubles event he partnered with Marion Jones, the winner of the singles title at the 1899 U.S. Championships, and lost in the semifinal against his brother who had teamed up with Charlotte Cooper.

Between 1902 and 1906 Doherty played for the British Davis Cup team and was undefeated during this period. In 1902 he partnered his brother to win the doubles match in the challenge round against the United States but the latter retained the Cup after a 3–2 victory. In 1903 Doherty won both his singles matches as well as the doubles match to help the British Isles to their first Davis Cup victory. In 1904, 1905 and 1906 he was part of the British team that successfully defended the Cup.

The brothers co-wrote R.F. and H.L. Doherty on Lawn Tennis (1903).

He gave up tennis for golf in 1906 and distinguished himself in that sport as well. In 1908 Doherty reached the last 16 of the British amateur championship at the Royal St George's course.

In 1914, after the outbreak of World War I, Doherty joined the Anti-Aircraft branch of the Royal Naval Volunteer Reserve but was released in 1915 due to ill health.

Doherty died of toxemia on 21 August 1919 at Leon Cottage in Broadstairs, Kent after suffering from tubercular nephritis and cystitis for two years. He was inducted into the International Tennis Hall of Fame in 1980 together with his brother.

Grand Slam finals

Singles: 7 (6 titles, 2 runner-up)

Doubles: 12 (10 titles, 2 runners-up)

Singles titles

References

External links

 
 
 
 
 

1875 births
1919 deaths
19th-century English people
19th-century male tennis players
Alumni of Trinity Hall, Cambridge
English people of Irish descent
English male tennis players
English Olympic medallists
Olympic bronze medallists for Great Britain
Olympic gold medallists for Great Britain
Olympic tennis players of Great Britain
People from Wimbledon, London
Tennis people from Greater London
International Tennis Hall of Fame inductees
Tennis players at the 1900 Summer Olympics
United States National champions (tennis)
Wimbledon champions (pre-Open Era)
Olympic medalists in tennis
Grand Slam (tennis) champions in men's singles
Grand Slam (tennis) champions in men's doubles
Medalists at the 1900 Summer Olympics
British male tennis players